John Willoughby Crawford  (26 August 1817 – 13 May 1875) served as the third Lieutenant Governor of Ontario, Canada from 1873 to 1875.

Born in 1817 in Manorhamilton, County Leitrim, Ireland, the son of George Crawford, John Crawford came to Upper Canada as a child when his family settled in Brockville. He married Helen Sherwood of York, Upper Canada (Toronto). A lawyer by profession, Crawford served as president of the Royal Canadian Bank and was solicitor for the Grand Trunk Railway. In 1867, he was appointed Queen's Counsel. He also became president of the Toronto and Nipissing Railway in 1868 and also served as a director of the Toronto, Grey and Bruce Railway.

Crawford was member of the Legislative Assembly of the Province of Canada for East Toronto from 1861 to 1863. He then served as a House of Commons of Canada from 1867 to 1873, and supported representation by population. On the day his government resigned in 1873, The Right Honourable Sir John A. Macdonald appointed Crawford Lieutenant Governor of Ontario.

In the months leading to his death, Crawford's health was poor.  following several months of ill health. He died on 13 May 1875 at Government House, his official residence. His funeral service was conducted at St. James Cathedral with interment at a vault belonging to his wife's family.

References

External links 
 

1817 births
1875 deaths
19th-century Irish people
Irish expatriates in Canada
Irish emigrants to pre-Confederation Ontario
Canadian Anglicans
Conservative Party of Canada (1867–1942) MPs
Lieutenant Governors of Ontario
Members of the House of Commons of Canada from Ontario
Members of the Legislative Assembly of the Province of Canada from Canada West
Lawyers in Ontario
People from Leeds and Grenville United Counties
Politicians from County Leitrim
Canadian King's Counsel
Immigrants to Upper Canada
People from Manorhamilton